Puerto Rico Highway 138 (PR-138)  is a north–south bypass located west of downtown Coamo, Puerto Rico. This road extends from PR-155 to the junction of PR-14 with PR-153 and is known as Avenida Luis Muñoz Marín.

Major intersections

See also

 List of highways numbered 138

References

External links
 

138
Coamo, Puerto Rico